Chime or chimes may refer to:

Places 
 Chimes, Arkansas, a community in the United States

People 
 Terry Chimes (born 1956), English musician
 Chime Rinpoche (born 1941), Tibetan Buddhist Lama and Tulku
 Chime Tulku (born 1991), Buddhist Tulku

Acronyms 
 Canadian Hydrogen Intensity Mapping Experiment, a radio telescope
 College of Healthcare Information Management Executives, the professional organization for chief information officers and other senior healthcare IT leaders
 Zunich–Kaye syndrome, also known as CHIME syndrome, a rare combination of congenital birth defects

Arts, entertainment, and media

Musical instrument or tone 
 Chime (bell instrument), an array of large bells, typically housed in a tower and played from a keyboard
 Chimes, the sounds produced by a striking clock to announce the hours
 Bar chimes (also known as "mark tree"), a series of many small chimes of decreasing length, arranged horizontally
 Chime bars, individual instruments similar to glockenspiel bars but with resonators
 Macintosh startup chime, the sound a Macintosh computer makes on startup
 Tubular bell, or chimes, a percussion instrument struck with hammers
 Warning chime, a sound used in machinery or computers to alert users of a dangerous condition, error, completion of a process, etc.
 Wind chime or Aeolian chime, suspended bells sounded when blown together by the wind
 Handchimes, an instrument that is rung by hand, similar to handbells.

Music

Albums 
 Chime (Yuki Saito album), 1986
 Chime (Dessa album), 2018
 Chimes EP, 2014 EP by Hudson Mohawke

Songs 
 "Chime" (song), a 1989 single release by Orbital
 "Chimes" (song), a 2014 single release by Hudson Mohawke

Other music 
 Chimes (Gavrilin), a Russian-language choral work by Valery Gavrilin that premiered in 1984

Other arts, entertainment, and media 
 Chime (novel), a 2011 young adult novel by Franny Billingsley
 Chime (video game), released in 2010
 Chimes, a magical force that paradoxically destroys magic in the novel Soul of the Fire by Terry Goodkind

Other uses 
 Chime (company), an American financial technology company
 Chime, the rim of a barrel, one at each end
 Amazon Chime, an enterprise collaboration service from Amazon Web Services
 MDL Chime, a plugin used by web browsers to display the 3D structure of molecules

See also 
 
 
 Chime Communications (disambiguation)
 Chimera (disambiguation)
 Chyme, human body digestive fluid
 The Chimes (disambiguation)